Santa Clara (Portuguese and Spanish for Saint Clare or Saint Clair) may refer to:

Places

Africa
 Santa-Clara (municipality) or Curoca, Angola
 Santa Clara, Gabon

Asia
 Santa Clara, Quezon, Philippines
 Santa Clara, Santa Maria, Philippines
 Santa Clara, Santo Tomas, Batangas, Philippines

Europe
 Santa Clara, Coimbra, Portugal
 Santa Clara (Lisbon), Portugal
 Santa Clara-a-Velha, Odemira, Portugal
 Santa Clara-a-Nova e Gomes Aires, Almodôvar, Portugal
 Santa Clara (Ponta Delgada), Azores
 Santa Clara Island (San Sebastian), Spain

North and Central America
 Santa Clara, Corozal District, Belize
 Santa Clara Province, Cuba
 Santa Clara, Cuba
 Santa Clara, Consolación del Sur, Cuba
 Santa Clara, San Vicente, El Salvador
 Santa Clara La Laguna, Guatemala
Santa Clara, Chiriquí, Panama
 Santa Clara, Coclé, Panama
 Santa Clara, Panamá Oeste, Panama
 Santa Clara, Durango, Mexico 
 Santa Clara del Cobre, Mexico
 Santa Clara (Mexibús), a BRT station in Ecatepec, Mexico
 Santa Clara (Mexicable), an aerial lift station in Ecatepec, Mexico

United States
 Santa Clara County, California, in the San Francisco Bay Area
 Santa Clara, California, a city within the county
 Santa Clara Transit Center, in the city
 Santa Clara University, in the city
 Mission Santa Clara de Asís, origin of the city and county, now surrounded by the university 
 Santa Clara station (VTA), a  light rail station on Santa Clara Street in San Jose, the largest city in Santa Clara County
 Santa Clara Valley, better known as "Silicon Valley", including Santa Clara County and other counties
 Santa Clara Valley AVA, a wine region primarily in the county
 Santa Clara River (California), in Ventura  and Los Angeles counties in Southern California
 Santa Clara River Valley, in Ventura County
 Santa Clara station (Metrorail), Allapattah, Miami, Florida
 Santa Clara, New Mexico
 Santa Clara Indian Reservation, New Mexico
 Santa Clara Pueblo, New Mexico
 Santa Clara, New York
 Santa Clara, Eugene, Oregon
 Santa Clara, Texas
 Santa Clara, Utah
 Santa Clara River (Utah)
 Santa Clara Volcano, Utah

South America
 Santa Clara, Jujuy, Argentina
 Santa Clara, La Rioja, Argentina
 Santa Clara do Sul, Rio Grande do Sul, Brazil
 Santa Clara d'Oeste, São Paulo, Brazil
 Santa Clara Island, Chile

Other uses
 Santa Clara (baseball club), a Cuban team from 1922 to 1941, known as the Leopards
 Niña, or Santa Clara, one of the three ships on Christopher Columbus's first voyage
 C.D. Santa Clara de El Salvador, a football club in Pasaquina, La Union
 C.D. Santa Clara, a football club in Santa Clara, Ponta Delgada, Azores
 , originally Santa Clara, a 15th century ship
 The Santa Clara, a student newspaper of Santa Clara University, California
 Battle of Santa Clara, a 1958 conflict in Cuba

See also

Saint Clair (disambiguation)
Saint Clare (disambiguation)
St. Claire (disambiguation)
Santa Clarita (disambiguation)
St. Clara, West Virginia
Saint Clara (film)